Melanoxerus is a genus of flowering plants belonging to the family Rubiaceae.

Its native range is Madagascar.

Species:
 Melanoxerus suavissimus (Homolle ex Cavaco) Kainul. & B.Bremer

References

Rubiaceae
Rubiaceae genera
Taxa named by Birgitta Bremer